“Somebody's Eyes” is a song from the 1984 movie Footloose whose lyrics were written by Dean Pitchford, who wrote the film's screenplay and source story, and whose music was composed by Tom Snow. It was later used in the 1998 musical version.

“Somebody's Eyes” was originally sung by Karla Bonoff, and it reached #16 on the US Billboard Adult Contemporary chart in 1984.

Overview 
The movie and musical versions of the song are very different in tone and lyrics. In the movie, it is a soft rock love song (featured on the soundtrack), sung by a girl afraid that her boyfriend's ex still has feelings for him, and will interfere with their relationship (the refrain in this song is "Love is no disguise/From Somebody's Eyes"). In the musical adaptation, it is a plot-driven song, sung by the characters Rusty, Wendy Jo and Urleen to Ren McCormack, about the strict rules and morality that pervades the town of Bomont (refrain here being: "You've got no disguise/From Somebody's Eyes").

Personnel 
Karla Bonoff - vocals, background vocals
Tom Snow - fender rhodes
Alan Pasqua - synthesizer
Nathan East - bass
Michael Landau - guitar
Michael Botts - percussion
Wendy Waldman - background vocals

1984 singles
Songs from Footloose
Songs written by Dean Pitchford
Songs written by Tom Snow
Karla Bonoff songs